Felix Gill (born 1 June 2002) is a British tennis player. 

Gill has a career high ATP singles ranking of World No. 428 achieved on 23 May 2022. He also has a career high ATP doubles ranking of World No. 459 achieved on 13 June 2022. He has reached 5 career singles finals on the ITF World Tennis Tour with two victories. 

Felix is set to make his ATP Tour debut at the upcoming 2022 Wimbledon Championships, as he received a wildcard entry into the main draw of the Men's Doubles bracket with compatriot Arthur Fery.

ATP Challenger and ITF World Tennis Tour finals

Singles: 8 (2–6)

Doubles: 2 (1–1)

References

External links
 
 

2002 births
Living people
British male tennis players
21st-century British people
English male tennis players
Tennis people from Worcestershire